Nathan Lawson may refer to:
 Nathan Lawson (ice hockey)
 Nathan Lawson (rugby union)